Bram Wiertz (21 November 1919 – 20 October 2013) was a Dutch footballer who competed in the 1952 Summer Olympics.  At the time of his death aged 93, Wiertz was the oldest living Dutch international footballer.

References

External links
 

1919 births
2013 deaths
AFC DWS players
Association football midfielders
Dutch footballers
Footballers at the 1952 Summer Olympics
Footballers from Amsterdam
Netherlands international footballers
Olympic footballers of the Netherlands